List of hospitals in Iowa (U.S. state), sorted by hospital name.

Adair County Health System - Greenfield, Iowa
Audubon County Memorial Hospital and Clinics - Audubon, Iowa
Avera Holy Family Hospital - Estherville, Iowa
Avera Merrill Pioneer Hospital - Rock Rapids, Iowa
Alegent Health Mercy Hospital - Council Bluffs, Iowa
Boone County Hospital - Boone, Iowa 
Broadlawns Medical Center - Des Moines, Iowa 
Buchanan County Health Center - Independence, Iowa
Buena Vista Regional Medical Center - Storm Lake, Iowa
Burgess Health Center - Onawa, Iowa
Cass County Health System - Atlantic, Iowa
Cherokee Regional Medical Center - Cherokee, Iowa
CHI Health Mercy Corning - Corning, Iowa
CHI Health Mercy Council Bluffs - Council Bluffs, Iowa
CHI Health Missouri Valley - Missouri Valley
Clarinda Regional Health Center - Clarinda, Iowa
Clarke County Hospital - Osceola, Iowa
Community Memorial Hospital - Sumner, Iowa
Compass Memorial Healthcare - Marengo, Iowa
Crawford County Memorial Hospital - Denison, Iowa 
Dallas County Hospital - Perry, Iowa
Davis County Hospital and Clinics - Bloomfield, Iowa
Decatur County Hospital - Leon, Iowa
Floyd County Medical Center - Charles City, Iowa
Floyd Valley Healthcare - Le Mars, Iowa
Fort Madison Community Hospital - Fort Madison, Iowa 
Genesis Medical Center-Davenport - Davenport, Iowa
Genesis Medical Center-De Witt - De Witt, Iowa
George C. Grape Community Hospital - Hamburg, Iowa
Great River Health System - West Burlington, Iowa
Greater Regional Health - Creston, Iowa
Greene County Medical Center - Jefferson, Iowa
Grundy County Memorial Hospital - Grundy Center, Iowa
Gundersen Palmer Lutheran Hospital and Clinics - West Union, Iowa
Guthrie County Hospital - Guthrie Center, Iowa
Guttenberg Municipal Hospital - Guttenberg, Iowa 
Hancock County Health System - Britt, Iowa 
Hansen Family Hospital - Iowa Falls, Iowa
Hawarden Regional Healthcare - Hawarden, Iowa
Hegg Health Center Avera - Rock Valley, Iowa 
Henry County Health Center - Mount Pleasant, Iowa
Horn Memorial Hospital - Ida Grove, Iowa
Humboldt County Memorial Hospital - Humboldt, Iowa
Iowa Specialty Hospital-Belmond - Belmond, Iowa
Iowa Specialty Hospital-Clarion - Clarion, Iowa
Jackson County Regional Health Center - Maquoketa, Iowa
Jefferson County Health Center - Fairfield, Iowa
Keokuk County Health Center - Sigourney, Iowa
Knoxville Hospital and Clinics - Knoxville, Iowa
Kossuth Regional Health Center - Algona, Iowa
Lakes Regional Healthcare - Spirit Lake, Iowa
Loring Hospital - Sac City, Iowa
Lucas County Health Center - Chariton, Iowa
Madison County Health Care System - Winterset, Iowa
Mahaska Health - Oskaloosa, Iowa
Manning Regional Healthcare Center - Manning, Iowa
Mary Greeley Medical Center - Ames, Iowa
Mercy Iowa City - Iowa City, Iowa
Mercy Medical Center-Cedar Rapids - Cedar Rapids, Iowa
MercyOne Cedar Falls Medical Center - Cedar Falls, Iowa
MercyOne Centerville Medical Center - Centerville, Iowa
MercyOne Clinton Medical Center - Clinton, Iowa
MercyOne Clive Rehabilitation Hospital - Clive, Iowa
MercyOne Des Moines Medical Center - Des Moines, Iowa
MercyOne Dubuque Medical Center - Dubuque, Iowa
MercyOne Dyersville Medical Center - Dyersville, Iowa
MercyOne Elkader Medical Center - Elkader, Iowa
MercyOne New Hampton Medical Center - New Hampton, Iowa
MercyOne Newton Medical Center - Newton, Iowa
MercyOne North Iowa Medical Center - Mason City, Iowa
MercyOne Oelwein Medical Center - Oelwein, Iowa
MercyOne Primghar Medical Center - Primghar, Iowa
MercyOne Siouxland Medical Center - Sioux City, Iowa
MercyOne Waterloo Medical Center - Waterloo, Iowa
MercyOne West Des Moines Medical Center - West Des Moines, Iowa
Methodist Jennie Edmundson - Council Bluffs, Iowa
Mitchell County Regional Health Center - Osage, Iowa
Monroe County Hospital and Clinics - Albia, Iowa
Montgomery County Memorial Hospital - Red Oak, Iowa
Myrtue Medical Center - Harlan, Iowa
Orange City Area Health System - Orange City, Iowa
Osceola Regional Health Center - Sibley, Iowa 
Ottumwa Regional Health Center - Ottumwa, Iowa
Palo Alto County Hospital - Emmetsburg, Iowa
Pella Regional Health Center - Pella, Iowa
Pocahontas Community Hospital - Pocahontas, Iowa
Regional Health Services of Howard County - Cresco, Iowa
Regional Medical Center - Manchester, Iowa
Ringgold County Hospital - Mount Ayr, Iowa
Sanford Medical Center Sheldon - Sheldon, Iowa
Select Specialty Hospital-Des Moines - Des Moines, Iowa
Select Specialty Hospital-Quad Cities - Davenport, Iowa
Shenandoah Medical Center - Shenandoah, Iowa
Sioux Center Health - Sioux Center, Iowa 
Spencer Hospital - Spencer, Iowa 
Saint Anthony Regional Hospital - Carroll, Iowa
Stewart Memorial Community Hospital - Lake City, Iowa
Story County Medical Center - Nevada, Iowa
UnityPoint Health-Allen Hospital - Waterloo, Iowa
UnityPoint Health-Blank Children's Hospital - Des Moines, Iowa
UnityPoint Health-Finley Hospital - Dubuque, Iowa
UnityPoint Health-Grinnell Regional Medical Center - Grinnell, Iowa
UnityPoint Health-Iowa Lutheran Hospital - Des Moines, Iowa
UnityPoint Health-Iowa Methodist Medical Center - Des Moines, Iowa
UnityPoint Health-Jones Regional Medical Center - Anamosa, Iowa
UnityPoint Health-Keokuk - Keokuk, Iowa
UnityPoint Health-Marshalltown - Marshalltown, Iowa
UnityPoint Health-Methodist West Hospital - West Des Moines, Iowa
UnityPoint Health-Saint Luke's Hospital - Cedar Rapids, Iowa
UnityPoint Health-Saint Luke's, Sioux City - Sioux City, Iowa
UnityPoint Health-Trinity Bettendorf - Bettendorf, Iowa
UnityPoint Health-Trinity Muscatine - Muscatine, Iowa
UnityPoint Health-Trinity Regional Medical Center - Fort Dodge, Iowa
University of Iowa Hospitals and Clinics - Iowa City, Iowa
VA Central Iowa Health Care System-DSM - Des Moines, Iowa
Van Buren County Hospital - Keosauqua, Iowa 
Van Diest Medical Center - Webster City, Iowa
Veterans Memorial Hospital - Waukon, Iowa
Virginia Gay Hospital – Vinton, Iowa
Washington County Hospital and Clinics - Washington, Iowa
Waverly Health Center - Waverly, Iowa
Wayne County Hospital and Clinic System - Corydon, Iowa
Winneshiek Medical Center - Decorah, Iowa

Closed Hospitals 
Mercy Capitol Hospital - Des Moines, Iowa
Mercy Covenant Clinics - Arlington, Iowa
Xavier Hospital - Dubuque, Iowa

Iowa

Hospitals